The Women's 1500 metres at the 2011 World Junior Short Track Speed Skating Championships will be held on February 25 at the Forum Sport Center ice rink.

Results

Heats
Top 3 Athletes from each heat qualify for Quarterfinals.

Heat 1

Heat 3

Heat 5

Heat 7

Heat 9

Heat 2

Heat 4

Heat 6

Heat 8

Heat 10

Quarterfinals
Top 3 Athletes from each heat qualify for Semifinals.

Heat 1

Heat 3

Heat 5

Heat 2

Heat 4

Heat 6

Semifinals
Top 2 Athletes from each heat qualify for Final.

Heat 1

Heat 3

Heat 2

Final

References

2011 World Junior Short Track Speed Skating Championships